Social Studies is an album by American composer, bandleader and keyboardist Carla Bley recorded in 1980 and released on the Watt/ECM label in 1981.

Reception
The Allmusic review by Alex Henderson awarded the album 4½ stars and stated "Bley's risk-taking serves her quite well on Social Studies, an unorthodox and adventurous pearl that is as rewarding as it is cerebral". The Penguin Guide to Jazz awarded the album 3 stars stating "Social Studies shouldn't be missed: a bookish cover masks some wonderfully wry music".

Track listing
All compositions by Carla Bley except where noted.
 "Reactionary Tango (In Three Parts)" (Carla Bley, Steve Swallow) - 12:54 
 "Copyright Royalties" - 6:45 
 "Útviklingssang" - 6:31 
 "Valse Sinistre" - 4:56 
 "Floater" - 5:56 
 "Walking Batteriewoman" - 4:24

Personnel
 Carla Bley - organ, piano
 Michael Mantler - trumpet 
 Carlos Ward - alto saxophone, tenor saxophone 
 Tony Dagradi - tenor saxophone, clarinet 
 Joe Daley - euphonium 
 Gary Valente - trombone 
 Earl McIntyre - tuba 
 Steve Swallow - bass guitar
 D. Sharpe - drums

References

ECM Records albums
Carla Bley albums
1981 albums